Skil Brum, or Skilbrum, is a mountain in the Karakoram range in Gilgit–Baltistan, Pakistan, approximately 9 km (5 mi) west-southwest of K2. It lies on the western side of the Godwin-Austen Glacier, roughly opposite Broad Peak.

In 1957, Marcus Schmuck and Fritz Wintersteller made a flash first ascent of Skil Brum, in pure Alpine style. Starting from base camp of Broad Peak at 4,950 metres, they camped at 6,060 metres, made the summit the next day, then camped again at 6,060 metres, and then returned to base camp the next morning. The whole ascent, from base camp to base camp was done in 53 hours, a startlingly short time for a major Himalayan ascent in that era.

See also
 List of mountains in Pakistan
 List of highest mountains of the world

Notes and sources

 Summitpost.org: Skil Brum

External links
 Skil Brum auf BroadPeak.at (German Language)

Mountains of Gilgit-Baltistan
Seven-thousanders of the Karakoram